The NBA Finals is the annual championship series of the National Basketball Association (NBA). The Eastern and Western Conference champions play a best-of-seven game series to determine the league champion. The team that wins the series is awarded the Larry O'Brien Championship Trophy, which replaced the original Walter A. Brown Trophy in 1977, though under the same name.

The series was initially known as the BAA Finals prior to the 1949–50 season when the Basketball Association of America (BAA) merged with the National Basketball League (NBL) to form the NBA. The competition oversaw further name changes to NBA World Championship Series from 1950 to 1985, as well as a brief stint as the Showdown, before settling on NBA Finals in 1986. Since 2018, it has been officially known as the NBA Finals presented by YouTube TV for sponsorship reasons.

The NBA Finals was initially structured in a 2–2–1–1–1 format. In 1985, to ease the amount of cross-country travel, it was changed to a 2–3–2 format, in which the first two and last two games of the series were played at the arena of the team who earned home-court advantage by having the better record during the regular season. In 2014, the 2–2–1–1–1 format was restored. This team hosts the first two games and the other team hosts the next two games. If needed, the remaining three are played at each team's home arena alternately.

A total of 19 franchises have won the NBA Finals, with the Golden State Warriors winning the most recent title in 2022. The Los Angeles Lakers and the Boston Celtics hold the record for the most victories, having both won the competition 17 times. The Boston Celtics also won the most consecutive titles, winning eight in a row from 1959 to 1966. The Los Angeles Lakers have competed in the NBA Finals the most times, with 32 appearances. The Eastern Conference has provided the most champions, with 38 wins from 10 franchises; the Western Conference has 35, from nine franchises.

History

1946–1956: Beginnings and Lakers dynasty
The beginning era of modern professional basketball was dominated by the Minneapolis Lakers, who won half of the first ten titles. The Philadelphia Warriors also won multiple championships, including the inaugural title in 1947 and another in 1956 to bookend the NBA's first decade. 
After being founded in 1946, the Basketball Association of America completed its inaugural season in April 1947 with the Philadelphia Warriors defeating the Chicago Stags in five games. The following season the Warriors would again reach the Finals, however they would fall short to the now defunct Baltimore Bullets. To date the Baltimore Bullets are the only defunct team to win a championship.

In 1948 the Minneapolis Lakers would win the championship of the rival National Basketball League before joining the BAA. Led by future Hall of Famer George Mikan, the Lakers would win the third and final BAA championship in 1949 over the Red Auerbach coached Washington Capitals. The BAA would merge with the NBL to become the National Basketball Association before the 1949–50 season. The Lakers would win the inaugural NBA championship in 1950 to become the first team to repeat as champions.

In 1951 the Rochester Royals defeated the New York Knicks in the only Finals contested between two teams from the same state. This would be the first of three consecutive losses in the Finals for the Knicks, as they would lose the 1952 and 1953 Finals to the Lakers. The Lakers would win again in 1954 to become the first team to three-peat. This would be the fifth championship in six years for the Lakers and their last title won in Minneapolis. In 1955 the Syracuse Nationals would win their only title before becoming the Philadelphia 76ers, and in 1956 the Warriors won their second and last title in Philadelphia before eventually moving to California.

Of the five franchises to win a championship from 1947 to 1956, one would fold and the other four would all relocate by 1964.

1957–1969: Celtics dynasty

The Boston Celtics went 11–1 in the NBA Finals during 13 seasons (1956–57 to 1968–69), including eight straight NBA championships from 1959 through 1966. During this time the St. Louis Hawks also captured their only title before eventually moving to Atlanta, the Philadelphia 76ers won their first title since relocating from Syracuse, and the Lakers and Warriors returned to the Finals for the first time in California.

With the establishment of the Celtics dynasty in 1957, spearheaded by center Bill Russell, the team saw great success. Despite encountering some difficulty when up against teams led by Wilt Chamberlain, for most of the late 1950s and 1960s, the Celtics and Russell managed to have an upper hand on Chamberlain's teams.

In 1964, Chamberlain, who had moved to the state of California alongside his team, led the San Francisco Warriors to a Western Conference championship, but again failed to conquer the Celtics. The following season, he returned to the Eastern Conference to join the Philadelphia 76ers, who were the former Syracuse Nationals that had relocated to the city to cover the vacancy created with the departure of the Warriors.

The first clash between the two stars in the playoffs was in 1966, with Boston winning the series 4–1. In the following season, Philadelphia coach Alex Hannum instructed Chamberlain to provide an increased focus on playing a team game, to avoid drawing the double-teams that troubled Chamberlain during the Finals. This tactical change brought the team to a new record of 68 wins the following season, as well as defeating the Celtics before winning the 1967 Finals. In 1968, Boston overcame a 3–1 deficit against Philadelphia to once again arrive in the Finals. They went on to defeat the Los Angeles Lakers in the Finals to again become NBA champions.

In 1969, the Celtics faced great difficulty entering the postseason, as they had an aging team and multiple injuries to a number of players. They qualified for the playoffs as the fourth and final seed in the East, while the Lakers, who had added Chamberlain in the off-season to join stars Jerry West and Elgin Baylor, won the West and were prohibitive favorites to become champions for the first time since relocating to Los Angeles. Despite holding a 2–1 advantage going into Game 4, the Lakers led 87–86 and had the ball with 10 seconds to play. But after a turnover, Sam Jones scored to give the Celtics a narrow 88–87 win and tying the series. The series was eventually tied 3–3 going into Game 7 in Los Angeles, with Lakers owner Jack Cooke hanging balloons in the arena in anticipation of a Lakers victory. West also picked up injuries to his thigh and hamstring during the series, but returned to play for the final game. Russell utilized this newly lacking mobility in West to organize fast breaks at every opportunity for the Celtics, which allowed them to gain an early lead. They held off a furious Lakers comeback to win 108–106 and win the series, and win their eleventh championship in 13 years.

As many stars either declined or retired following this win, it is largely recognized as the last NBA Finals conducted by the Celtics dynasty.

1970–1979: Decade of parity
The 1970s saw ten different teams reach the Finals and eight different teams win a championship, the most of any decade in the NBA, with the Celtics and New York Knicks winning twice.

In 1970, a classic final featured the Knicks against the Lakers. In the waning moments of Game 3, with the series tied, Jerry West hit a basket from 60 feet to tie the game, a shot which became one of the most famous ever. However, the Knicks won in overtime and continued their momentum for a 4–3 win, becoming the first team after the Celtics dynasty to win an NBA championship. The Milwaukee Bucks also won their first title, defeating the Baltimore Bullets in 1971.

Two seasons after losing in the Finals, the Lakers won 33 straight games, the longest such streak in NBA history. By season's end, they broke the record for most wins in a season with 69, one more than the 1966–67 Philadelphia 76ers, before taking home the championship for the first time since relocating to Los Angeles. The Knicks returned to win the Finals again a season later, their second championship.

Despite the rise of the Knicks, the 1974 championship returned to the Celtics.

Following the success of the Lakers, the 1970s were characterized by a major breakthrough of the league's western franchises. In 1975, after compiling a 48–34 regular season record, the Golden State Warriors swept the Washington Bullets 4–0 in the 1975 NBA Finals. In 1976, the Phoenix Suns, after only eight years of existence as a franchise, overcame a losing record early in the season to build a remarkable win streak to finish 42–40. They achieved upset victories over the Seattle SuperSonics and the Warriors, before facing Boston in the Finals. The teams split the first four games, before Game 5 went into three overtimes and Boston won 128–126. The Celtics quickly managed to secure their 13th championship, defeating the Suns 87–80 in Game 6.

Other franchises that won their first titles in the 1970s included the Portland Trail Blazers in 1977, and the Washington Bullets, who defeated the SuperSonics in 1978. The SuperSonics managed to exact revenge on the Bullets the following season, as they won their first title in 1979.

1980–1990: Celtics–Lakers rivalry and "Bad Boys" Pistons

The 1980s were mostly known for the rivalry between the Boston Celtics and the Los Angeles Lakers, who combined to win eight titles in the decade. The rivalry unofficially began at the 1979 NCAA Men's Division I Basketball Championship Game, featuring Magic Johnson's Michigan State University team facing off against Larry Bird's Indiana State University team, which attracted the largest TV rating ever for an NCAA Championship game, as 38 percent of all television viewers that night tuned in. Bird and Johnson both entered the league in 1979, leading their respective teams to dazzling heights.

Rookie Magic Johnson led the Showtime Lakers to the 1980 NBA Finals against the 76ers, which were also led by NBA superstar Julius Erving. The Lakers took a 3–2 lead, but Kareem Abdul-Jabbar could not play in Game 6 due to injury. Johnson, a natural point guard, was shifted to center, and ended up playing every position on the court during the game, scoring 42 points, while also attaining 15 rebounds and 7 assists to win his first championship while being awarded his first NBA Finals MVP; a remarkable performance in the annals of the sport.

Boston reached the 1981 NBA Finals led by the "Big Three" of Larry Bird, Kevin McHale, and Robert Parish. Considered to be one of the best front courts of all time, all three players later made the Naismith Memorial Basketball Hall of Fame. They met the Houston Rockets in the 1981 Finals, practically single-handedly carried by Moses Malone, who upset the Lakers and Johnson in the first round. The Rockets were only the second team in NBA history to make the Finals after posting a losing record in the regular season, and the Celtics had an NBA best record of 62–20. The Celtics won the Finals in 6 games.

The Lakers returned to the NBA Finals in 1982, this time led by new coach Pat Riley, in a rematch against the 76ers. The 76ers defeated the Celtics in the Eastern Conference finals in a 7-game series, but were defeated by Lakers in 6 games, with Johnson being named Finals MVP. Upon losing their past three NBA Finals appearances, the 76ers decided that they needed one more piece to become champions, and on September 15, 1982, they traded for Malone, who was also the league's reigning MVP. With the new duo of Malone and Erving, the 76ers won the 1983 NBA Finals, losing only once in the entire playoffs, including a sweep of the Lakers.

The 1984 NBA Finals was contested by the Celtics and Lakers, who faced each other for the first time since 1969. After an inspired performance from Bird, the Celtics toppled the Lakers 4–3. The final game of this series attracted the largest ever TV audience for an NBA game, and the second-largest ever for a basketball game, with only the game between the two stars played five years earlier having a larger audience. It was the last NBA Finals played in the 2–2–1–1–1 format until 2014.

In the 1985 NBA Finals, the Lakers avenged their previous loss by defeating the Celtics in six games. Although the Lakers lost the first game by 34 points in the Memorial Day Massacre, they won 4 of the next 5 games, including Game 6 at the Boston Garden. These finals were the first to be played in the 2–3–2 format, which was suggested by Boston coach Red Auerbach to NBA commissioner David Stern, as he hoped to cut back on the frequent traveling from Boston to Los Angeles.

The 1986 NBA Finals saw the Celtics face off against the Rockets, with Boston winning in six games, securing their 16th title. Bird was named Finals MVP for the second time. In 1987, the Lakers and Celtics met again. The Lakers won the first two games, but Boston won Game 3. In Game 4, Johnson hit a hook shot with two seconds left to give the Lakers a 107–106 win and a 3–1 series lead. The Lakers lost Game 5, but eventually won Game 6 to clinch the series, and a 2–1 win against the Celtics. Johnson was named Finals MVP for the third time.

In the following two seasons, the aging Celtics failed to reach the Finals, becoming overshadowed by the rise of the Detroit Pistons. The Lakers managed to defend their title in the 1988 Finals, winning the series in 7 games against the Pistons. They then became the first team to win back-to-back NBA titles since 1969. Seeking a three-peat in 1989, the Lakers were swept by the Pistons in a rematch of the previous year's Finals. In 1990, the Pistons then went back-to-back after defeating the Clyde Drexler-led Portland Trail Blazers in five games, attaining the nickname "Bad Boys" due to their rough, physical play led by a Hall of Fame back court in Joe Dumars and Isiah Thomas and a rugged front court in Dennis Rodman and Bill Laimbeer.

1991–1998: Bulls dynasty

The majority of the 1990s was marked by the supremacy of the Chicago Bulls. The Bulls, led by head coach Phil Jackson and star players Michael Jordan and Scottie Pippen, won six titles in six Finals appearances from 1991 to 1998. The only other team to win a title during this time was the Houston Rockets who won titles in 1994 and 1995.

The first championship came at the expense of the Los Angeles Lakers, which also saw the last appearance in the Finals for Magic Johnson. Billed as a showdown between the aging Johnson and the upstart Jordan, the Lakers won the first game, 93–91. For the rest of the series, Pippen guarded Johnson, allowing Jordan to primarily focus on scoring, and Chicago won the next four games. The Bulls returned to the Finals the next year, pitted against Clyde Drexler and the Portland Trail Blazers. Throughout the 1991–1992 season, Jordan and Drexler led their teams to the best records in their respective conferences, leading to several comparisons between the two players in anticipation of a postseason match-up. Chicago defeated the Trail Blazers in Game 1 by 33 points, a game notable for Jordan breaking the record for the most three-pointers in a first half, with six. Game 2 went into overtime, with the Trail Blazers outscoring the Bulls 18–7 in the final period to win the game, even with Drexler fouling out in the 4th quarter. Games 3 and 4 were split between Chicago and Portland, respectively, but the Bulls won the final two games, clinching their second championship.

In 1993, Jordan was matched against close friend Charles Barkley, who was the league's reigning MVP of the Phoenix Suns. The Bulls won the first two games in Phoenix, 100–92 and 111–108. The Suns, rallying behind Barkley, won Game 3, 129–121 in Chicago in triple overtime. The Bulls won Game 4, 111–105, with Jordan scoring 55 points and tying Rick Barry for the second-most points in an NBA Finals game. The Suns won Game 5, 108–98, sending the series back to Phoenix. Chicago clinched the series in Game 6, 99–98, on John Paxson's three-pointer, as the Bulls became the third team in history to three-peat. After this win, Jordan retired from basketball to pursue a career in baseball.

Following Jordan's departure, the Houston Rockets, led by Hakeem Olajuwon, won the 1994 and 1995 NBA titles. During this time, Olajuwon became the only player in history to win the NBA MVP, NBA Defensive Player of the Year and Finals MVP awards in the same season. That was the only year that both the NBA and NHL Finals went to seven games, with the Rockets facing the New York Knicks in 1994. With their win in Game 7, the Rockets denied New York from winning both the NBA and NHL titles in the same year, as the New York Rangers won the 1994 Stanley Cup Finals. After trading for Clyde Drexler midseason, the Rockets later swept an Orlando Magic team consisting of Shaquille O'Neal and Penny Hardaway in the 1995 Finals; Olajuwon was again named Finals MVP, and the Rockets became the fifth franchise to win back-to-back titles and became the first 6th-seeded team to win the title without enjoying home court advantage on any of their playoff series. The Houston Rockets also beat teams with at least 50 regular season wins in every round of the playoffs, with "Road Court" advantage. No other team in NBA History has done that. The Houston Rockets were down 3 games to 1 to the Phoenix Suns in the Semi-Finals and won 2 out of 3 games on the road, including game 7 to advance to the Conference Finals.

After his short stint with baseball, Jordan returned to basketball late in the 1994–95 season. Although he did not lead the Bulls to the Finals for that season, he returned to pre-retirement form the next season while the team acquired perennial rebounding champion Dennis Rodman. The 1995–96 Bulls finished the regular season 72–10, attaining, at the time, the best regular season record in NBA history. They dominated in the playoffs, with series records of 3–0, 4–1 and 4–0, before facing the Seattle SuperSonics in the NBA Finals. After the Bulls took a 3–0 series lead, Seattle won the next two games after point guard Gary Payton asked his coach George Karl to be switched onto Jordan, leading to a sixth game. Jordan altered his game to deal with Payton, and the Bulls won Game 6 to win their fourth title.

In 1997 and 1998, the Bulls met the Utah Jazz in the Finals twice. Led by Dream Team Olympians John Stockton and Karl Malone, the Jazz were defeated in both Finals by the Bulls in six games. In both series, Chicago won by hitting winning shots in the sixth game, the first by Steve Kerr in 1997 in Chicago, and the second by Jordan in Utah in 1998. This saw Chicago winning their sixth NBA championship, and winning their second three-peat. Before the lockout shortened 1998–99 season, Jackson decided to retire, which set off a chain reaction that resulted in most of the team, including Jordan and Pippen, leaving the Bulls. With no foundation of youth to build upon, the Bulls became a lottery-bound team for the next six seasons.

1999–2014: Spurs, Lakers and Heat dominance

Between 1999 and 2014, the San Antonio Spurs, Los Angeles Lakers, or Miami Heat appeared in every Finals, winning a combined 13 championships over 16 seasons.

The Spurs were responsible for winning five championships during this time, in 1999, 2003, 2005, 2007, and 2014. In the 1999 NBA playoffs, the Spurs finished with a 15–2 mark, including sweeps of the Blazers and Lakers. With a defensive squad led by David Robinson and Tim Duncan, San Antonio's 84.7 points allowed per game was the fewest average points allowed in the postseason in the last 30 years. In the Finals that year, the Spurs held the New York Knicks, the first #8 seed team to reach the finals in NBA history, to an average of 79.8 points per game. During the 2003 NBA Finals, the Spurs defeated the New Jersey Nets in 6 games, which also marked the first championship contested between two former ABA teams. In Game 6, Duncan was two blocks short of recording the first quadruple-double in NBA Finals history, finishing with 21 points, 20 rebounds, 10 assists, and 8 blocks. The Spurs also defeated the Detroit Pistons 4–3 in 2005, and swept the LeBron James-led Cleveland Cavaliers in 2007. Duncan won the Finals MVP in 1999, 2003 and 2005, while Tony Parker won in 2007, becoming the first European-born player to do so.

The Lakers also won five championships in this period, including a three-peat from 2000 to 2002, led by Shaquille O'Neal and Kobe Bryant. Their first championship came at the expense of the Indiana Pacers, whom the Lakers defeated in 6 games. During their 2001 postseason run, the Lakers swept their first 3 series and won the Finals against the Philadelphia 76ers in 5 games, finishing with an unprecedented 15–1 record, the best postseason record in NBA history at the time. In 2002, the Lakers swept the New Jersey Nets, leading almost the entire time in each game. O'Neal won the finals MVP all three times.

In the 2003 off-season, veteran stars Gary Payton and Karl Malone signed with the Lakers. Along with Bryant and O'Neal, they formed what many expected to be one of the best teams in NBA history, and were the favorites to win the championship in 2004. However, the Detroit Pistons, under coach Larry Brown, defeated the Lakers in 5 games. Chauncey Billups was named the Finals MVP. Now established as one of the powerhouses of the East, the Pistons returned to the NBA Finals the following year, before losing to the Spurs in seven games.

O'Neal was traded from the Lakers to the Miami Heat in 2004, where he teamed up with young phenom Dwyane Wade. Together they led the Heat to the 2006 NBA Finals against the Dallas Mavericks, who won the first two games at home, but Miami won the next four straight after multiple fourth quarter comebacks led by Wade, who won the Finals MVP award.

The Lakers returned to the Finals in 2008 against the Boston Celtics, renewing the teams' rivalry with the 11th Finals matchup between them. The Celtics defeated the Lakers 4–2, led by their "Big Three" superstars of Ray Allen, Kevin Garnett, and Finals MVP Paul Pierce. The Lakers bounced back from the loss and returned to the Finals in 2009, where they defeated the Orlando Magic, led by Defensive Player of the Year Dwight Howard, in five games. The Lakers met the Celtics once again in 2010, trailing 3–2 before winning the last two at home, marking the first time in history that the Celtics lost a Game 7 in the NBA Finals. Kobe Bryant was named Finals MVP both years, as head coach Phil Jackson surpassed Red Auerbach's record for most NBA titles of all time with eleven.

During the 2010 off-season, the Miami Heat re-signed team captain Dwyane Wade and added free agents LeBron James and Chris Bosh to form a new Big Three. The Heat were subsequently considered heavy title favorites and appeared in the next four Finals, starting in 2011 against the Dallas Mavericks in a rematch from five years earlier. Despite being heavy underdogs on paper, the Mavericks won the series 4–2, with Dirk Nowitzki being named the Finals MVP. The Heat returned to the Finals in the following year against a young Oklahoma City Thunder team featuring future MVPs Russell Westbrook, James Harden, and Kevin Durant. After the Thunder won Game 1 at home, the Heat won four straight games to win the series 4–1, becoming the first team to win a championship after trailing in three playoff series. James won his first championship and was unanimously named NBA Finals MVP.

The Heat repeated as champions in 2013, this time over the San Antonio Spurs, with the finals being the first since 1987 to feature four former Finals MVPs in the Finals (Duncan, Parker, Wade and James). The Spurs went up 3–2 in the series, but the Heat bounced back with a historic Game 6 victory, notable for a game-tying three-pointer by Ray Allen in the closing seconds of regulation to send the game into overtime. The Heat won Game 7 to clinch the title, and James was named Finals MVP for the second straight year. Miami sought a three-peat in the 2014 NBA Finals in a rematch with the Spurs, but this time San Antonio prevailed in five games, winning their first title since 2007 and the fifth and final title of Duncan's career. Kawhi Leonard was named Finals MVP, becoming the third-youngest Finals MVP after Duncan and Magic Johnson.

2015–present: Warriors dynasty

The Golden State Warriors appeared in six Finals between 2015 and 2022, winning four championships in 2015, 2017, 2018 and 2022.

In the 2014 off-season, LeBron James returned to the Cleveland Cavaliers where he teamed up with Kyrie Irving and Kevin Love to form a new "Big Three" in Cleveland. The Cavaliers would appear in the next four straight Finals against the Golden State Warriors, known for their unconventional small-ball, three-point shooting offense implemented by coach Steve Kerr and spearheaded by two-time MVP Stephen Curry. They became the first two teams to play in more than two consecutive Finals against one another.

In the 2015 NBA Finals, the Cavaliers took a 2-1 series lead, but lost stars Irving and Love to injury. The Warriors came back to win the series in six games, with Andre Iguodala winning NBA Finals MVP for his efforts in containing LeBron James on defense. The following season, the Warriors broke the record for most regular season wins with a record of 73–9 and Curry won his second straight MVP award by unanimous vote, shattering his own record for three-pointers made in a single season. The Warriors and Cavaliers met once again in the 2016 NBA Finals, where the Warriors opened up a 3–1 series lead, but James and Irving led the Cavaliers to two straight victories to force a deciding Game 7. In a key sequence with two minutes remaining in Game 7, LeBron James made a memorable chase-down block on Iguodala to keep the game tied, while Irving hit a 3-point shot a minute later to take the lead. Cleveland held on to win the title and end the city's championship drought, with James earning his third Finals MVP honor.

In the 2016 off-season, the Warriors acquired Kevin Durant through free agency. After finishing 67–15 (the first team to win 67+ games in three straight seasons), they returned to the Finals with a 12–0 sweep of the West, the first team to do so since 2001. The Cavaliers slipped to the second seed going into the playoffs, but they only lost one game en route to the 2017 NBA Finals, setting up a third straight match with the Warriors. The Warriors started strong with a 3–0 lead over the Cavaliers, eventually winning the series in five games with Durant being named Finals MVP. The Warriors set a playoff record of 15 consecutive wins and a 16–1 final record, as well as a 13.5-point differential in the Finals. The Cavaliers traded away Kyrie Irving in the 2017 off-season and continued to change their roster throughout the season, while the Warriors largely remained intact. Neither Cleveland nor Golden State earned the top playoff seed in the 2017–18 season, and both teams fell to 3–2 deficits in the Conference Finals, but both came back to win the series and ensure a fourth consecutive Finals matchup in 2018. The Warriors swept the Cavaliers 4–0, and Durant was again named Finals MVP.

In 2018, James left the Cavaliers and signed with the Los Angeles Lakers. Without James, the Cavaliers struggled and did not return to the playoffs. The Warriors continued their success and reached their fifth straight Finals in 2019, becoming the first team since the 1960s Celtics and the first Western Conference team ever to do so. However, after injuries to stars Kevin Durant and Klay Thompson, the Warriors were defeated by the Toronto Raptors 4–2, resulting in the Raptors' first championship and the first NBA title for a team based outside the United States. Toronto's Kawhi Leonard was named Finals MVP, becoming the first player to win the award while representing teams from both conferences, having previously won it with the San Antonio Spurs in 2014.

The 2019–20 NBA season was suspended in March 2020 due to the COVID-19 pandemic, and resumed on a shortened schedule in July 2020 inside the NBA Bubble in Orlando, Florida. LeBron James returned to his tenth Finals with the Los Angeles Lakers against the Miami Heat in the 2020 NBA Finals, marking the first time in NBA history that two teams that missed the playoffs the year before met in the Finals. The Lakers won the series 4–2, claiming their 17th title to tie the Boston Celtics' franchise record; LeBron James was named Finals MVP for the fourth time in his career, becoming the first player to win the award with three different franchises. 

The 2021 NBA Finals saw the Milwaukee Bucks defeat the Phoenix Suns in the first Finals since 1971 to feature no players who had previously won a championship. Two-time NBA MVP Giannis Antetokounmpo earned Finals MVP honors.

After missing the playoffs two years in a row, the Warriors returned to the 2022 Finals for their sixth appearance in the last eight seasons. They defeated the Boston Celtics in six games for their fourth championship in eight seasons, and Curry won his first NBA Finals MVP award unanimously.

Sponsorship
As part of a multiyear partnership that began in 2018, the internet television service YouTube TV became the presenting sponsor of the NBA Finals.

Team records

Finals appearances
The statistics below refer to series wins and losses, not individual games won and lost. For individual game statistics, scroll further downwards.

Active franchises with no Finals appearances

(*) As a result of the original franchise's relocation to New Orleans, the NBA team in Charlotte suspended operations for the 2002–03 and the 2003–04 seasons, before a new team, named the Bobcats, was established for the 2004–05 season. In 2014, the original Hornets were renamed the Pelicans and obtained the records during their time in New Orleans and Oklahoma City from 2002 to 2013. The Bobcats became the second incarnation of the Charlotte Hornets, and retained the history and records of the Hornets organization from 1988 to 2002.

Individual games records

Player records

Career
 Most years in Finals (12) – Bill Russell
 Most games played in Finals (70) – Bill Russell
 Most career points in Finals (1,679) – Jerry West
 Most career assists in Finals (584) – Magic Johnson
 Most career rebounds in Finals (1,718) – Bill Russell
 Most career blocks in Finals (116) – Kareem Abdul-Jabbar
 Most career steals in Finals (102) – Magic Johnson
 Most career turnovers in Finals (196) – LeBron James
 Most career three-point field goals in Finals (152) – Stephen Curry
 Most career free throws made in Finals (453) – Jerry West

Series
 Most points, one series (284) – Elgin Baylor (1962)
 Most assists, one series (95) – Magic Johnson (1984)
 Most rebounds, one series (189) – Bill Russell (1962)
 Most blocks, one series (32) – Tim Duncan (2003)
 Most steals, one series (20) – Isiah Thomas (1988)
 Most turnovers, one series (31) – Magic Johnson (1984) and LeBron James (2016)
 Most three-point field goals, one series (32) – Stephen Curry (2016)
 Most free throws made, one series (82) – Elgin Baylor (1962)
Game
Most points, one game (61) – Elgin Baylor (1962)
 Most assists, one game (21) – Magic Johnson (1984)
 Most rebounds, one game (40) – 2x Bill Russell (1960) and (1962)
 Most blocks, one game (9) – Dwight Howard (2009)
 Most steals, one game (7) – Robert Horry (1995)
 Most turnovers, one game (10) – Magic Johnson (1980)
 Most three-point field goals, one game (9) – Stephen Curry (2018)
 Most free throws made, one game (21) – Dwyane Wade (2006)

 
Total points (finals)
 Jerry West – 1,679
 LeBron James – 1,562
 Kareem Abdul-Jabbar – 1,317
 Michael Jordan – 1,176
 Elgin Baylor – 1,161
 Bill Russell – 1,151
 Sam Jones – 1,143
 Tom Heinsohn – 1,037
 John Havlicek – 1,020
 Magic Johnson – 971

PPG average (min 10 games) (finals)
 Rick Barry – 36.3
 Michael Jordan – 33.6
 Jerry West – 30.5

See also

 List of NBA champions
 List of NBA players with most championships
 List of NBA championship head coaches
 NBA G League Finals

Notes

References

External links
 NBA Finals: All-Time Champions
 List of Championships – Year by Year

 
Recurring sporting events established in 1947
1947 establishments in the United States
Annual sporting events in the United States
June sporting events